Norman Jay Levitt (August 27, 1943 – October 24, 2009) was an American mathematician at Rutgers University.

Education
Levitt was born in The Bronx and received a bachelor's degree from Harvard College in 1963. He received a PhD from Princeton University in 1967.

Work
Levitt was best known for his tireless criticism of "the academic Left"—the social constructivists, deconstructionists, and postmodernists—for their anti-science stance which "lump[s] science in with other cultural traditions as 'just another way of knowing' that is no better than any other tradition, and thereby reduce the scientific enterprise to little more than culturally-determined guess work at best and hegemonic power mongering at worst". His books (see Bibliography below) and review articles, such as "Why Professors Believe Weird Things: Sex, Race, and the Trials of the New Left" (Levitt emphasized that his own view was left-wing, but such ideas dismayed him), expose the "academic silliness" and analyze the symptoms and roots of the academic Left's belief that "solemn incantation can overturn the order of the social universe, if only the jargon be appropriately obscure and exotic, and intoned with sufficient fervor". His book Higher Superstition is cited as having inspired the Sokal affair.

Bibliography
 1989 Grassmannians and the Gauss Maps in Piecewise-Linear Topology
 1994 Higher Superstition: The Academic Left and Its Quarrels With Science (with Paul R. Gross)
 1997 The Flight from Science and Reason
 1999 Prometheus Bedeviled: Science and the Contradictions of Contemporary Culture

References

Further reading

External links
 Bibliography of Norman Levitt
 Obituary of Norman Levitt

1943 births
2009 deaths
20th-century American mathematicians
20th-century American Jews
Critics of postmodernism
Harvard College alumni
Princeton University alumni
Rutgers University faculty
The Bronx High School of Science alumni
People from the Bronx
21st-century American mathematicians
Academics from New York (state)
21st-century American Jews